Youxian District is a district of the city of Mianyang, Sichuan Province, China.

References

External links
 Official website 
 

Districts of Sichuan
Mianyang